The Komla Dumor Award is a journalism award launched by the BBC in 2015 in honour of the legacy of Ghanaian journalist Komla Dumor who worked for BBC World News and was the main presenter of its programme Focus on Africa.

Award details 
The award is presented each year "to an outstanding individual living and working in Africa, who combines strong journalism skills, on air flair, and an exceptional talent in telling African stories with the ambition and potential to become a star of the future."  The winner is given a three-month training and development contract in BBC News.

Winners

References 

Journalism awards
Awards established in 2015
BBC awards
African awards